Nafissa Sid-Cara or Nafissa Sidkara (18 April 1910, in El Eulma, Algeria - 1 January 2002, Paris, France) was a French politician. Sid-Cara was the first female minister to serve in the French Fifth Republic as well as the first ever Algerian origin and Muslim woman to serve as a minister in a French government. She was appointed Secretary of State in charge of social affairs in Algeria under Prime Minister Michel Debré in 1959–62. This was the first time a woman was appointed into a French government since 1937.

Personal life
Sid-Cara's family were Algerians of Turkish origin; her brother, Chérif Sid Cara was also a French politician.

References

1910 births
2002 deaths
People from El Eulma
Algerian War
Algerian people of Turkish descent
French people of Algerian descent
French people of Turkish descent
Women government ministers of France
20th-century French politicians
20th-century French women politicians
Migrants from French Algeria to France